16 Most Requested Songs is a compilation album by American pop singer Johnny Mathis that was released in 1986 by Columbia Records and features 12 tracks representing his time with the label from 1956 to 1963, including his Billboard top 10 hits "Chances Are", "It's Not for Me to Say", "The Twelfth of Never", "Gina", and "What Will Mary Say" as well as his signature song, "Misty". The remaining four selections ("Evergreen (Love Theme from A Star Is Born)", "Love Theme from Romeo and Juliet (A Time for Us)", "(Where Do I Begin) Love Story", and "Didn't We") were recorded with Columbia between 1969 and 1977.

On August 4, 2000, the album received Gold certification from the Recording Industry Association of America for sales of 500,000 copies.

Reception

Stephen Thomas Erlewine of Allmusic retrospectively gave the collection a good review. "Although other sets may have a few more tracks, this is a very entertaining sampler."

Track listing

 "Chances Are" (Robert Allen, Al Stillman) – 3:03
 Mitch Miller - producer 
Ray Conniff - arranger, conductor
 "It's Not for Me to Say" (Robert Allen, Al Stillman) – 3:05  
Al Ham, Mitch Miller - producers 
Ray Conniff - arranger, conductor
 "Misty" (Johnny Burke, Erroll Garner)  – 3:34
Al Ham, Mitch Miller - producers
Glenn Osser - arranger, conductor
 "Wild Is the Wind" (Dimitri Tiomkin, Ned Washington) – 2:26
Al Ham, Mitch Miller - producers
Ray Ellis - arranger, conductor
 "Wonderful! Wonderful!" (Sherman Edwards, Ben Raleigh) – 2:50
Al Ham, Mitch Miller - producers
Ray Conniff - arranger, conductor
 "Maria" (Leonard Bernstein, Stephen Sondheim) – 3:45
 Mitch Miller - producer
Glenn Osser - arranger, conductor
 "The Twelfth of Never" (Jerry Livingston, Paul Francis Webster) – 2:28
 Mitch Miller - producer 
Ray Conniff - arranger, conductor
 "Small World" (Stephen Sondheim, Jule Styne) – 3:18
Mitch Miller - producer
Glenn Osser - arranger, conductor
 "Evergreen (Love Theme from A Star Is Born)" (Barbra Streisand, Paul Williams) – 3:15
 Jack Gold - producer 
Gene Page - arranger, conductor
 "Love Theme from Romeo and Juliet (A Time for Us)" (Larry Kusik, Nino Rota, Eddie Snyder) – 2:58
 Jack Gold - producer 
Ernie Freeman - arranger, conductor
 "What Will Mary Say" (Eddie Snyder, Paul Vance) – 3:09
Ernie Altschuler  - producer
Don Costa - arranger, conductor
 "When Sunny Gets Blue" (Marvin Fisher, Jack Segal) – 2:41
Al Ham, Mitch Miller - producers
Ray Conniff - arranger, conductor
 "A Certain Smile" (Sammy Fain, Paul Francis Webster) – 2:47
Al Ham, Mitch Miller - producers
Ray Ellis - arranger, conductor
 "(Where Do I Begin) Love Story" (Francis Lai, Carl Sigman) – 2:46
 Jack Gold - producer
Perry Botkin Jr. - arranger, conductor
 "Didn't We" (Jimmy Webb) – 2:49
 Jack Gold - producer 
Ernie Freeman - arranger, conductor
 "Gina" (Leon Carr, Paul Vance) – 2:46
Ernie Altschuler  - producer
Don Costa - arranger, conductor

Personnel

Johnny Mathis – vocals
Mike Berniker – preparation and remastering
Tim Geelan – engineering, preparation and remastering
Nancy Stahl – artwork
Howard Garwood – liner notes
Digitally mastered at CBS, New York

References

Bibliography

1986 compilation albums
Johnny Mathis compilation albums
Albums arranged by Ray Ellis
Albums arranged by Glenn Osser
Albums produced by Mitch Miller
Albums produced by Al Ham
Columbia Records albums